Sheykh Jabrail (also Romanized as Sheykh Jabra’īl and Sheykh Jabr’īl; also known as Chekān-e Mansūrī, Shaikh Jarwāil, and Sheykh Jarvā’īl) is a village in Gowavar Rural District, Govar District, Gilan-e Gharb County, Kermanshah Province, Iran. At the 2006 census, its population was 106, in 24 families.

References 

Populated places in Gilan-e Gharb County